Michael Lynch (born January 1962) is a British trade unionist. He has served as the General Secretary of the National Union of Rail, Maritime and Transport Workers (RMT) since May 2021.

Early life
Lynch was born into an Irish Catholic family in West London in January 1962, the youngest of five children. His father, Jackie Lynch, was from Cork in County Cork, Ireland, and his mother, Ellen "Nellie" Morris, was from outside Crossmaglen in the south of County Armagh in Northern Ireland; they both emigrated during the Second World War. Jackie worked as a labourer and postman, whilst Nellie was a cleaner.

Lynch grew up in the Paddington area of London in what he describes as "rented rooms that would now be called slums". He was raised Catholic, but is no longer. He left school at the age of 16 and qualified as an electrician, then worked in construction before being illegally blacklisted for joining a union.

Career
In 1993, unable to find any more work in construction, he began working for Eurostar, and became active in the National Union of Rail, Maritime and Transport Workers (RMT). Twenty years later, he received a settlement for the illegal blacklisting.

Lynch voted for Brexit in 2016 because, "I don't personally believe that the European Union should be a sovereign country". This stance was in line with that of his RMT union which encouraged its membership to vote for Brexit, providing several reasons including protection of workers rights. He reiterated his support for Brexit in 2022, and later said he had done so in order to renationalise the railways, which he said was not possible within the EU.

Lynch served two terms as Assistant General Secretary of the RMT, and two terms on its executive. In 2020, after General Secretary Mick Cash took time off due to ill health, Lynch was appointed as the acting General Secretary, but stood down after a few months, accusing members of the union's national executive of bullying and harassment. This accusation was similar to Cash's. Lynch won an election for the permanent role of General Secretary and took up the position in May 2021.

As part of the media coverage of the RMT's 2022–23 strikes, Lynch gained widespread attention for his appearances in interviews and debates on the BBC, Sky News, TalkTV, and ITV.

On 23 June 2022, Lynch was a panellist on BBC One's Question Time. On 23 September 2022, he was a panellist on BBC One's Have I Got News for You.

Personal life
Lynch's wife, Mary has been a nurse and trade unionist in the NHS since 1984. They have three children.

Lynch has cited Irish republican and trade union leader James Connolly (1868–1916) as his political hero and inspiration. 

He supports and follows Irish sports, and is a fan of Cork City. He has expressed his admiration for Ray Houghton, amongst other Irish sportspeople.

References

External links
 Radio interview on Second Captains Saturday: Mick Lynch RTÉ
 Mick Lynch on UK Rail Strikes on Brendan O'Connor

1962 births
Living people
General Secretaries of the National Union of Rail, Maritime and Transport Workers
Members of the General Council of the Trades Union Congress
People from Paddington
English socialists
British people of Irish descent
English people of Irish descent
Former Roman Catholics
British republicans